Nigel Vinson, Baron Vinson LVO (born 27 January 1931), is a British entrepreneur, inventor, philanthropist and Conservative former member of the House of Lords.

Early life and business career
Vinson was born 27 January 1931, second son of Ronald Vinson (died 1976), a gentleman farmer of Huguenot descent, and his second wife Bettina Myra Olivia (died 1966), daughter of general practitioner Gerald Southwell-Sander. She had studied medicine at the University of Edinburgh, but gave up her studies to marry. She was a "voracious reader", who supplemented her sons' education by reading to them from the classics. Ronald Vinson purchased the fourteenth-century Nettlestead Place at Wateringbury near Maidstone, Kent, commissioning the architect Percy Morley Horder to rescue the house from "chronic disrepair", it having spent the previous two centuries as an oast house. He also owned three other farms- Bow Hill, Barming, and Beckett's- totalling around 1,200 acres, and was an early adopter of mechanical farming technology; he was regarded as "the best shot in Kent- some said in England". By his first wife, Constance, who died during the pneumonia epidemic following the First World War, he had three sons. Nigel Vinson "enjoyed a privileged upbringing entirely free of care and want", learning to fish, ride, and shoot on his father's property. Before the Second World War, the family employed five servants- a butler, housekeeper, two maids, and a nanny.

Nigel Vinson was educated at Brambletye preparatory school before going to Pangbourne College; he achieved sufficient success to qualify for a place at the University of London (his lack of classics qualification preventing him from attending Oxford or Cambridge), but he decided to focus on practical business experience over a degree. After school he served in the Queen's Royal Regiment from 1948 to 1950, reaching the rank of Lieutenant.

In 1952 Vinson, then aged 21, set up a small plastics company, later to be named Plastic Coatings, with two employees. The company, which operated from a Nissen hut in Guildford, was one of the first to find the technical means to apply a thin coat of plastic to metal and to recognise the huge number of applications that this would have. By 1969 when the company was floated on the London Stock Exchange, it employed over 1,000 employees in five different locations, winning the Queen's Award for Industry in 1971. At the time of the flotation, Vinson gave 10 percent of the shares to the company's employees before selling his own stake in  the firm to Imperial Tobacco, resigning as executive chairman a year later.

Vinson was Deputy Chairman of Electra Investment Trust 1990 to 1998.

Political career
Vinson's decision to give up a full-time business career was the result of his determination to find a role for himself in reversing economic and political trends which he believed would have left Britain poorer and less free and to champion the concept of a social market economy. After a failed attempt to be selected as the Conservative parliamentary candidate for Aldershot in 1974, he sought instead to assist others directly engaged in seeking to challenge the prevailing economic orthodoxy. Introduced to Antony Fisher, the eccentric old Etonian founder of the Institute of Economic Affairs, Vinson gave money to the Institute at a time when its finances were precarious and its survival uncertain. Vinson became an IEA trustee, chairman of its trustees from 1989–95 and life IEA vice-president, becoming a close friend and  ally of Ralph Harris (later Lord Harris of High Cross), the Institute's General Director. Harris introduced Vinson to Sir Keith Joseph who had broken with his party's commitment to the neo-Keynesian middle way in favour of market-based policies.

In 1974, Vinson joined Joseph and Margaret Thatcher as a co founder of the Centre for Policy Studies which, according to Thatcher, "was where our Conservative revolution began." Vinson, who found the Centre's first premises, underwrote the lease and employed its staff, served as honorary treasurer as well as contributing to the intellectual life of the think-tank. The role of the Centre was "to act as outsider, skirmisher, trail-blazer, to  moot new ideas and policies. Our task was to question the unquestioned, think the unthinkable, blaze new trails..." Vinson was the co-author of the Centre's first publication, Why Britain Needs a Social Market Economy (1974). According to Vinson's biographer he may have been influential in persuading Joseph not to stand for the Tory party leadership because the latter was temperamentally unsuited to the role, thereby setting the stage for Thatcher to enter the leadership race in 1975. When he resigned as CPS treasurer in 1980, Thatcher acknowledged in a personal letter of thanks the part Vinson had played in changing the direction of British politics: "What has been achieved during the last six years by way of winning the intellectual argument in favour of free enterprise and against socialism and corporatism would never have been possible without your patient guidance and tireless ability to provide, and then maintain, the foundation stone on which we have built."

According to a study of the part played by conservative and neo-liberal think tanks in reversing political trends during the 1970s and 80s, among the most influential of the CPS policy groups was its Personal Capital Foundation Group chaired by Vinson. This produced three proposals that became Government policy: personal pensions, personal equity plans (now ISAs), and the Enterprise Allowance Scheme. Although he broadly championed the pro-market policies advanced by the IEA and CPS, Vinson repeatedly argued that the high interest rates imposed as the centrepiece of Thatcher's counter inflation policy were needlessly harsh, causing severe and unnecessary hardship. When an independent assessment of UK monetary policy confirmed that this was the case monetary policy was gradually relaxed.

On 7 February 1985, he was created a life peer as Baron Vinson, of Roddam Dene in the County of Northumberland.

He is a regular attender at House of Lords debates, and spoke in the 2007 and 2014 sessions in support of nuclear power, against what he sees as the folly of policies based on costly British renewable generation solutions, increasing, he argues, fuel poverty, whilst the growing world population issue remains unaddressed.

On 4 August 2012, Lord Vinson threatened to defect to UKIP unless the Conservatives took a more Better Off Out approach to Europe. On 4 June 2013 he spoke and voted in the Lords against the Marriage (Same Sex Couples) Bill.

From 1980-90 Vinson served as the Chairman of the Rural Development Commission, during which time he initiated a series of reforms designed to remove restrictions and controls on rural enterprise. These included a change to planning laws that enabled redundant farm buildings to be turned into workshops leading to the creation of thousands of small rural firms. Vinson believed that the reforms slowed and ultimately reversed the drift of population from the countryside to towns and cities.

Vinson was Deputy Chairman of the Confederation of British Industry's Smaller Firms Council from 1979–84 and President of the Industrial Participation Association from 1979 to 1989.

Since 2003, he has been a Trustee of the think tank Civitas.

Philanthropy
The Nigel Vinson Charitable Trust, which Vinson set up in 1970 with an initial donation representing ten percent of current wealth, has since given more than £10 million to educational, humanitarian and environmental projects as well as to individual scholars and public policy foundations. Beneficiaries have included the University of Buckingham which unveiled the £8 million Vinson Building housing the Vinson Centre for Economics and Entrepreneurship in 2018.

He was founder donor of the Martin Mere Wildfowl Reserve in 1972 and gave a village green to Holbourn, Northumberland, in 2006.

He was a member of the Design Council from 1973 to 1980. From 1976 to 1978 he was an honorary director of the Queen's Silver Jubilee Appeal. He was a Member of the Northumbrian National Parks and Countryside Committee between 1977 and 1987, and a member of the Foundation for Science and Technology between 1991 and 1996.

In 2019, in an article in Standpoint magazine, Vinson criticised a number of major UK charities for spending their donors' money for purposes other than those for which it was raised, for overpaying senior staff and for straying into political activism.

Personal life

In 1972, Vinson married speech therapist Yvonne Ann, daughter of Dr John Olaf Collin (died 2000), MB BCh, of Forest Row, East Sussex; they have three daughters and nine grandchildren.

Vinson was invested as a Lieutenant of the Royal Victorian Order (LVO) in the 1979 New Year Honours.

He was a council member of St George's House, Windsor Castle, from 1990 to 1996.

Arms

Notes

References

External links

1931 births
Vinson 
Lieutenants of the Royal Victorian Order
Living people
People educated at Pangbourne College
Members of the Freedom Association
Life peers created by Elizabeth II